Philippe Jouvion is a professional researcher, freelance reporter and film producer. He worked for several years with the Cité des Sciences de la Villette in Paris producing films, and a number of his documentaries have won awards. At present he is working as a freelance journalist and is completing a television documentary on the environment.

As a journalist, he has mainly treated scientific and medical subjects, as well as tourism. He has published with Editions du Rouergue, in collaboration with Colette Gouvion.

Works
Gouvion, Colette and Philippe Jouvion. The Gardeners of God: an encounter with five million Bahai’ís (Originally published in French as Jardiniers de Dieu Oxford : Oneworld, 1993,  
Une maison tout en récup' : Matériaux anciens, idées nouvelles, Philippe Jouvion, 2001,  
La vie en vert, Philippe Jouvion, 1999,  
Cadeaux gourmands, Philippe Jouvion, Dorian Shaw, Colette Gouvion, 1999, 
Le Béret, Philippe Jouvion, 1998, 
Ces petits riens qui changent tout, Philippe Jouvion
Les Petits Meubles de récupération, Philippe Jouvion
Tout pour l'enfant: vite et pas cher,

References

French journalists
Living people
French male non-fiction writers
Year of birth missing (living people)